Suad al-Attar (Arabic, سعاد العطار) (born 1942) is an Iraqi painter whose work is in private and public collections worldwide, including The British Museum and the Gulbenkian Collection. She has held over twenty solo exhibitions, including one in Baghdad that became the first solo exhibition in the country's history for a woman artist. Her many awards include the first prize at the International Biennale in Cairo in 1984 and an award of distinction at the Biennale held in Malta in 1995.

Life and career
Suad at-Attar painted from a very young age. She was "discovered" by the influential Iraqi artist, Jawad Saleem after exhibiting in a high school event. He encouraged her to exhibit in events staged by The Baghdad Modern Art Group, and she became one of the few women who participated in functions organised by such art groups.

Suad attained degrees from both Baghdad University and California State University. She also undertook graduate work at the Wimbledon School of Art and the Central School of Art and Design in London, where she studied printmaking. She was the first female artist to have a solo exhibition in Baghdad.Suad left Baghdad with her husband and children in 1976, and settled in London. For her, the perpetual sense of longing for "home" has always been balanced by an awareness of the freedom that comes with distance. This freedom—a condition that gained added significance following the regime’s rise to power under Saddam Hussein in the late 1970s—has enabled her to explore her relationship with her homeland and to develop a personal visual language with which to express it.

Elements of this language are to be found within the traditions of Middle Eastern art. The winged creatures of Assyrian reliefs, Sumerian sculptures and the illuminated manuscripts of the Baghdadi School were instrumental. However, this awareness of her Arab heritage did not result in slavish imitation, but was forged with her own romantic imagination and an appreciation of western figurative traditions to create enigmatic images in which narrative and symbolism are intertwined.

A substantial monograph documenting her career was published in London in 2004. Much of Suad’s painting is characterised by an intense dreamlike and poetic sensibility that draws on motifs and symbols from within the traditions of Middle Eastern art. In recent years, these richly coloured representations of paradise and of sleeping cities bathed in turquoise blue, have disappeared from her work as she has become increasingly preoccupied with the plight of Iraq.

Her sister, Layla al-Attar (1944-1993), also an artist, together with her husband and their housekeeper, were killed by a U.S. missile attack on the Iraqi Intelligence main building which was just behind her house, ordered by U.S. President Bill Clinton on 27 June 1993..

Work

Her work has been described as introducing "an introspective dimension to visual folkloric investigations" ... Paintings represent a synthesis of Mesopotamian and Islamic aesthetics, expressed in a distinct and personal style.

When she relocated to London, much of her work was left behind in her Baghdad house and was lost to looting and vandalism following the 2003 invasion.

Selected paintings

See also
 Art of Mesopotamia
 Iraqi art
 Islamic art
 List of Iraqi artists

References

External links
 https://suadalattar.com/ Suad Al-Attar's official website.
 Suad al-Attar at ArtIraq - digital archive of reproductions of Iraqi artworks, maintained by Iraqi artists and includes many works lost or damaged during the 2003 invasion, and not accessible via any other reliable public source

Further reading
Anne Mullin Burnham, 1994, Reflections in Women's Eyes, Saudi Aramco World

1942 births
Artists from Baghdad
British people of Iraqi descent
Iraqi painters
Iraqi women artists
Living people
Iraqi women painters
20th-century Iraqi women
21st-century Iraqi women